or The International Garden and Greenery Exposition, organized as a part of the International Expositions Convention, was the first large-scale international gardening exposition in Asia and focused on the theme of the "Harmonious Coexistence of Nature and Mankind." The exposition was held in Tsurumi Ryokuchi, Osaka for 183 days, from Sunday, April 1 to Sunday, September 30, 1990. The convention included participation from 83 countries and 55 international organizations and attracted over 23,126,934 visitors.

One of its main activities was to establish the annual International Cosmos Prize.

This was an international horticultural exposition recognized by both the Bureau International des Expositions (BIE) and the International Association of Horticultural Producers.

References

External links 

 Expo '90 Foundation website (English version)
 Official website of the BIE

World's fairs in Osaka
International horticultural exhibitions
1990 in Japan
Osaka
History of Osaka Prefecture
Garden festivals in Japan